Thomas Watson (born 23 August 1943) is a Scottish former professional footballer. He played for Peterborough United, Walsall and Gillingham between 1965 and 1972.

References

External links

1943 births
Living people
Scottish footballers
Gillingham F.C. players
Peterborough United F.C. players
Walsall F.C. players
People from Lesmahagow
Association football wingers
Stevenage Town F.C. players
Maidstone United F.C. (1897) players
English Football League players